Pablo César Pachón Henao (born 8 October 1983) is a Colombian retired football defender.

Career
Pachón began his playing career with Independiente Santa Fe in 2001. He joined Patriotas F.C. in 2009.

Pachón partnered with José de la Cuesta in central defense at the Colombia national under-20 football team at the 2003 FIFA World Youth Championship in UAE, where Colombia finished fourth. Between 2005 and 2006 he made four appearances for the Colombia national team.

References

External links

 BDFA profile

1983 births
Living people
Colombian footballers
Colombia international footballers
Colombia under-20 international footballers
Independiente Santa Fe footballers
Patriotas Boyacá footballers
Association football defenders
Footballers from Bogotá
21st-century Colombian people